The Dorothy Q Apartments are a historic apartment house at 36 Butler Road in Quincy, Massachusetts.  It is a five-story brick Colonial Revival structure, consisting of two rectangular blocks joined at one end into a U shape.  Its trim elements are in limestone, and include corner quoining, keystones over the windows, and a modillioned cornice.  The complex was designed by Graves and Epps and built in 1929, during a period of rapid growth in the city.  It is named for the Dorothy Quincy Homestead, which is next door.

The building was listed on the National Register of Historic Places in 1989.

See also
National Register of Historic Places listings in Quincy, Massachusetts

References

Colonial Revival architecture in Massachusetts
Residential buildings completed in 1929
Buildings and structures in Quincy, Massachusetts
Apartment buildings on the National Register of Historic Places in Massachusetts
National Register of Historic Places in Quincy, Massachusetts